Anani Mikhaylov (born 1 July 1948) is a Bulgarian fencer. He competed in the individual and team sabre events at the 1972 and 1976 Summer Olympics.

References

1948 births
Living people
Bulgarian male sabre fencers
Olympic fencers of Bulgaria
Fencers at the 1972 Summer Olympics
Fencers at the 1976 Summer Olympics